On June 10, 2019, an Agusta A109E Power crashed onto the Axa Equitable Center on Seventh Avenue in Manhattan, New York City, which sparked a fire on the top of the building.  The helicopter involved in the accident, N200BK, was destroyed.  The only occupant was the pilot, Tim McCormack, who died in the crash.   The aircraft was owned by Italian American businessman Daniele Bodini at the time of the crash.

The flight originated from the East 34th Street Heliport (FAA LID: 6N5) at approximately 1:32 PM EDT bound for Linden, New Jersey. At around 1:43 PM EDT on June 10, 2019, the helicopter, an Agusta A109E Power, registration N200BK, crashed on the roof of the Axa Equitable Center, sparking a fire on the top of the building. The first emergency call was made at 1:43 PM. The FDNY has considered the accident as a "hard landing." The fire on the top of the highrise was extinguished quickly.

The NTSB final report states that day instrument meteorological conditions were encountered (nearby station reporting  overcast ceiling and  visibility) for the  Part 91 corporate flight, that basic visual flight rules weather minimums for helicopters are  visibility, and remain clear of clouds, that the pilot radioed that he "did not know where he was", and that tracking data showed that the helicopter "flew erratically" and "changed course and altitude several times". A witness-recorded video of part of the flight is available.

After the accident, New York City Mayor Bill de Blasio briefed the press, confirming a lack of further victims or apparent terroristic motive.  The National Transportation Safety Board sent agents to investigate the accident.  The accident prompted Mayor de Blasio to call for a ban on non-emergency helicopters flying over Manhattan.  Former City Parks Commissioner Adrian Benepe countered that the mayor had the authority to eliminate ninety percent of helicopter traffic by himself by eliminating the more than 200 daily tourist and charter flights from city-owned heliports.

See also 
2018 New York City helicopter crash

References

External links
  CBS Evening News pub. June 10, 2019
  The Daily Beast pub. June 10, 2019

Helicopter crash
2010s in Manhattan
New York City helicopter crash
Aviation accidents and incidents in New York City
New York City helicopter crash
Accidents and incidents involving helicopters
AgustaWestland aircraft
Axa
Seventh Avenue (Manhattan)
High-rise fires